Sabrina Maier (born 4 October 1994) is an Austrian alpine ski racer. Maier specializes in the speed events of Downhill and Super-G. Maier made her World Cup debut on 4 December 2015.

Career
In February 2011 she competed for Austria at the 2011 European Youth Olympic Winter Festival, she won the bronze medal in the Giant Slalom and Slalom. On 4 December 2015, Maier made her World Cup debut in Downhill at Lake Louise, Canada. On 18 December 2015 she scored her first World Cup points finishing 23rd in the Alpine combined at Val-d'Isère, France.

World Cup results

References

External links

 
 Sabrina Maier World Cup standings at the International Ski Federation
 

1994 births
Austrian female alpine skiers
Living people
20th-century Austrian women
21st-century Austrian women